The 2005–06 season was the Persepolis's 5th season in the Pro League, and their 23rd consecutive season in the top division of Iranian Football. They were also be competing in the Hazfi Cup. Persepolis was captained by Behrouz Rahbarifar.

Squad
As of February 2006.

Loan list

Transfers

In

Out

Technical staff

|}

Competition record

Iran Pro League

Standings

Competitions

Hazfi Cup

Final

2006 Hazfi Cup Final played after 2006–07 season's starts.

Scorers

See also
 2005–06 Iran Pro League
 2005–06 Hazfi Cup

References

External links
Iran Premier League Statistics
RSSSF

Persepolis F.C. seasons
Persepolis